The UAV Fulmar is a privately developed unmanned aerial vehicle system, its main application being to aid fishermen finding tuna banks, due to its ability to perform sea-landing.

An alternative version exists, which can be operated from ground. It is launched by means of a catapult and recovered by a net, easing operation and reducing costs.

Operators

References

External links
 Official Website

Unmanned aerial vehicles of Spain